Agiasma is a village and a community of the Voio municipality. Before the 2011 local government reform it was part of the municipality of Tsotyli, of which it was a municipal district. The 2011 census recorded 3 inhabitants in the village and 52 inhabitants in the community of Agiasma. According to the statistics of Vasil Kanchov ("Macedonia, Ethnography and Statistics"), 55 Greek Christians and 55 Vallahades (Grecophone Muslims) lived in the village in 1900.

Administrative division
The community of Agiasma consists of four separate settlements: 
Agiasma (population 3)
Agios Theodoros (population 34)
Achladia (population 12)
Koiladi (population 3)
The aforementioned population figures are as of 2011.

See also
List of settlements in the Kozani regional unit

References

Populated places in Kozani (regional unit)